Fayulu is a surname. Notable people with the surname include:

 Martin Fayulu (born 1956), Congolese businessman and lawmaker
 Timothy Fayulu (born 1999), Congolese footballer

Kongo-language surnames
Surnames of the Democratic Republic of the Congo